The U.S. state of Delaware has 17 state parks, as of 2008. Each of the parks is operated and maintained by the Delaware Division of Parks and Recreation, a branch of the Department of Natural Resources and Environmental Control (DNREC), although one state park, First State Heritage Park, is managed by the Division of Parks and Recreation in partnership with other city and state agencies.

Each of Delaware's three counties has at least one state park, with New Castle having the most. Wilmington State Parks, despite being administratively managed as a single unit, is further broken down into several smaller parks. The state park system includes over 26,000 acres of land and over 160 miles of trails. It is possible to faintly view the Milky Way from 10 of the 17 state parks.

In 2015, Delaware State Parks won the Gold Medal honoring the best state parks system in the country from the National Recreation and Park Association. It was the tenth state to win the award since it was started in 1997, and it beat out finalists Wyoming, Georgia (a seven-time finalist), and Missouri (a three-time finalist).

Overview
Delaware's oldest public lands date back to 1682 when, upon his arrival as proprietor of the colony, William Penn instructed his deputies to set aside land that is now Cape Henlopen State Park and its natural resources to be held in trust for the common good of all the citizens. The earliest attempts at legislating protection of a formalized public parks system were the result of efforts by conservationist William Poole Bancroft, who recognized the beauty of northern Delaware and in the late 19th century became determined to see it preserved for the benefit of future generations. Bancroft also donated many acres of his own land to form public parks as well as created a trust to manage and acquire land for the development of parks after his death.

Several of the state parks in northern Delaware were at one time either partially or wholly owned by estates belonging to members of the Du Pont family that were acquired by the state after the deaths of family members. Several other state parks throughout Delaware were converted from former military installations that were determined to be surplus property.

Three of northern Delaware's state parks (Alapocas Run, Brandywine Creek, and Wilmington) exist to protect pieces of the historic Brandywine River, which was once heavily utilized by local industry. Four of southern Delaware's state parks (Cape Henlopen, Delaware Seashore, Fenwick Island, and Holts Landing) preserve stretches of ocean and bay beaches, which are very popular in summer months.

State parks

Former state parks

See also
List of U.S. national parks
List of Delaware state wildlife areas
First State National Historical Park

External links
 Delaware State Parks

References

State parks of Delaware
Delaware state parks
Parks